Enrico Gras (7 March 1919 – 5 March 1981) was an Italian film director and screenwriter. He directed 22 films between 1941 and 1961.

Selected filmography
 Pictura: An Adventure in Art (1951)
 Lost Continent (1955)
 Dreams Die at Dawn (1961)

References

External links

1919 births
1981 deaths
Italian film directors
20th-century Italian screenwriters
Italian male screenwriters
Film people from Genoa
20th-century Italian male writers